Gur Mordan Tigh Ab (also Romanized as Gūr Mordān Tīgh Āb) is a village in Karvandar Rural District, in the Central District of Khash County, Sistan and Baluchestan Province, Iran. At the 2006 census, its population was 42, in 11 families.

References 

Populated places in Khash County